The Christian National Union Party (KNEP) was a political party in Hungary during the early 1920s.

History
It was renamed the Christian National Union Party shortly afterwards. In the January 1920 parliamentary elections it won 82 seats, finishing second behind the National Smallholders and Agricultural Labourers Party. The two parties formed a coalition government on 15 March.

Due to the presence of a number of strong personalities, including Sándor Ernszt, István Friedrich, Károly Huszár and Pál Teleki, the party quickly began to fragment, and by the spring of 1921 it had lost much of its strength. It continued under Wolff's leadership, and became known as the Wolff Party. The 1922 elections saw the party reduced to just 10 seats. It did not contest any further elections, and around 1930 it merged with the Christian National Economic Party to form the Christian Economic and Social Party.

Ideology
The party aimed to promote the interest of Catholics, and had a reactionary, anti-semitic programme. It was pro-Habsburg and pro-German.

Further reading

References

Far-right political parties in Hungary
Defunct political parties in Hungary
Political parties established in 1919
1919 establishments in Hungary
Catholic political parties
Christian political parties in Hungary
Monarchist parties